Sapyga is a genus of sapygid wasps. At least 19 species have been described in the genus.

Species

 Sapyga angustata Cresson, 1880
 Sapyga caucasica Radoszkowsky, 1880
 Sapyga centrata Say, 1836
 Sapyga coma Yasumatsu
 Sapyga glasunovi Morawitz, 1893
 Sapyga gusenleitneri Kurzenko, 1994
 Sapyga gussakovskii Kurzenko, 1986
 Sapyga hissarica Kurzenko, 1986
 Sapyga louisi Krombein, 1938
 Sapyga martini Smith, 1855
 Sapyga morawitzi Turner, 1911
 Sapyga multinotata Pic, 1920
 Sapyga mutica Kurzenko, 1994
 Sapyga octoguttata Dufour, 1849
 Sapyga pulcherrima Morawitz, 1894
 Sapyga quinquepunctata Fabricius, 1781
 Sapyga raddi Kurzenko, 1986
 Sapyga similis Fabricius, 1793
 Sapyga singla Kurzenko, 1994

References

Further reading

 
 
 

Parasitic wasps
Sapygidae